Westonbirt may refer to the following places in Gloucestershire, England:

Westonbirt (village), a village in the parish of Westonbirt with Lasborough
Westonbirt House, a country house
Westonbirt School, which now occupies the house
Westonbirt Arboretum